New Writings in SF 17 is an anthology of science fiction short stories edited by John Carnell, the seventeenth volume in a series of thirty, of which he edited the first twenty-one. It was first published in hardcover by Dennis Dobson in 1970, followed by a paperback edition issued under the slightly variant title New Writings in SF -- 17 by Corgi the same year.

The book collects seven novelettes and short stories by various science fiction authors, with a foreword by Carnell.

Contents
"Foreword" (John Carnell)
"More Things in Heaven and Earth" (H. A. Hargreaves)
"Aspect of Environment" (L. Davison)
"Soul Survivors" (Lee Harding)
"Death and the Sensperience Poet" (Joseph Green)
"Two Rivers" (R. W. Mackelworth)
"The Hero" (Ernest Hill)
"The True Worth of Ruth Villiers" (Michael G. Coney)

External links

1970 anthologies
17